Krtići (Cyrillic: Кртићи) is a village in the municipality of Konjic, Bosnia and Herzegovina.

Demographics 
According to the 2013 census, its population was 3, all Croats.

References

Populated places in Konjic